was a district located in Ōita Prefecture, Japan.

As of 2003, the district had an estimated population of 12,739 and the density of 48.85 persons per km2. The total area was 260.79 km2.

Until March 30, 2005, the district had two towns:
 Ajimu
 Innai

Merger
On March 31, 2005 - the towns of Ajimu and Innai were merged into the expanded city of Usa. Therefore, Usa District was dissolved as a result of this merger.

Former districts of Ōita Prefecture